José Panizo (5 October 1936 – 24 November 2018) was a Spanish wrestler. He competed at the 1960 Summer Olympics and the 1964 Summer Olympics.

References

1936 births
2018 deaths
Spanish male sport wrestlers
Olympic wrestlers of Spain
Wrestlers at the 1960 Summer Olympics
Wrestlers at the 1964 Summer Olympics
Sportspeople from Madrid
20th-century Spanish people